Vladislav Dimitrievich Kartaev (Картаев, Владислав Дмитриевич ; born February 10, 1992) is a Russian ice hockey player. He is currently playing with Salavat Yulaev Ufa of the Kontinental Hockey League (KHL).

Kartaev made his Kontinental Hockey League (KHL) debut playing with Salavat Yulaev during the 2010–11 KHL season.

References

External links

1992 births
Living people
Dizel Penza players
Lokomotiv Yaroslavl players
Metallurg Novokuznetsk players
Sportspeople from Chelyabinsk
Russian ice hockey forwards
Salavat Yulaev Ufa players